The 2009 Guwahati bombings occurred on 1 January 2009 in Guwahati, Assam, India. They occurred a few hours before Indian Home Minister P. Chidambaram was due to travel to the city.

The bombing was carried out by the United Liberation Front of Asom (ULFA), and left 6 people dead and a further 67 injured.

Details
Police confirmed that  first blast took place near Lokopriya Gopinath Bordoloi TB Hospital at Birubari at 2.35pm, injuring five people, including a 10-year-old child. Another blast at the busy Bhootnath market near the famous Kamakhya Temple, killed two people instantaneously and injured at least 25 others. Police said that a bomb was placed on a bicycle. Incidentally, P Chidambaram was to pass Bhootnath on his way from the airport.

The third blast occurred outside a Big Bazaar retail outlet at Bhangagarh, a commercial area near Guwahati Medical College (GMCH), at 5.45 pm. Bhangagarh is one of the poshest areas in Guwahati and is home to many shopping malls. Three of the 34 people injured in the blast succumbed to their injuries in hospital. Police suspected that the bomb was kept inside a pan shop in the area. Another person died in the hospital making the death toll 6.

All three blasts were low intensity, carried using Improvised explosive devices (IED). Police say that the a biker placed the first bomb in a dustbin, the second one was placed on a cycle and third on the roadside. The second blast was the most powerful one. The third blast ignited a fire due to its proximity to a kerosene source.

The injured were admitted to the GMCH and Mahendra Mohan Choudhury Hospital (MMCH) and are reported to be in critical condition.

Investigation
The United Liberation Front of Asom (ULFA) is suspected of having carried out the bombings.

Reactions
Assam Chief Minister Tarun Gogoi admitted security lapses and expressed the need of strengthening the state police force.

See also
2008 Assam bombings

References

Improvised explosive device bombings in 2009
Mass murder in 2009
Terrorist incidents in India in 2009
January 2009 crimes
January 2009 events in India
2000s in Assam
21st-century mass murder in India
History of Guwahati
Improvised explosive device bombings in India
Terrorism in Assam